Fight for Freedom is a song written in 1941 by Harold Levey and published by M. Witmark & Sons.

References

1941 songs
Songs of World War II